Glanton railway station served the village of Glanton, Northumberland, England from 1887 to 1953 on the Cornhill Branch.

History 
The station opened on 5 September 1887 by the North Eastern Railway. It was situated at the end of an approach road which was on the north side of an unnamed road. After closing to passengers on 22 September 1930, it was downgraded to a public delivery siding on 1 May 1950, before closing to goods on 2 March 1953. The goods shed and three cottages remain near the site of the station.

References

External links 

Disused railway stations in Northumberland
Former North Eastern Railway (UK) stations
Railway stations in Great Britain opened in 1887
Railway stations in Great Britain closed in 1930
1887 establishments in England
1953 disestablishments in England